Coulsdon Town railway station serves the northern part of Coulsdon, in the London Borough of Croydon. Until 22 May 2011 it was called Smitham.

History

The station was opened as Smitham on 1 January 1904, and was briefly closed (between 1 January 1917 and 1 January 1919) during the First World War. It lies on a sharp curve, where the line swings away westwards from the Brighton Main Line. It is immediately adjacent to the closed Coulsdon North station on the main line, whose passenger traffic was diverted here when the latter closed on 3 October 1983. Some Tattenham Corner line trains terminated at Smitham before returning to London, but nowadays the usual off-peak service is two trains per hour in each direction between London Bridge and Tattenham Corner. An hourly shuttle service used to be in operation during weekday off-peak hours between Purley and Tattenham Corner, but this was withdrawn in February 2015.  Services to London Victoria only run during the weekday business peaks and Mon-Fri evenings, though connections are available at East Croydon or Norwood Junction at other times.

The Coulsdon relief road, opened 18 December 2006 as part of the A23, passes underneath the station and meant that some rearrangement and refurbishment of the platform access routes was required.  No direct access to the London-bound platform now exists; access is via the down platform and a new footbridge or a lift.

A new modular station building on the down side of the line and a standard-pattern accessible footbridge were constructed by Network Rail and opened in 2010. There is no PERTIS self-service 'Permit to Travel' ticket machine.

As part of the retender of Southern's franchise in 2009, the Department for Transport requested that in response to lobbying by Croydon Council the new company look into a better name for the station, as "Smitham" is no longer used as the name of the local area. Coulsdon Town was chosen after a public vote. The change took place on Sunday 22 May 2011. 
Evening services to the station were improved in December 2010.

Services 
All services at Coulsdon Town are operated by Southern using  EMUs.

The typical off-peak service in trains per hour is:
 2 tph to 

On Sundays, the service is reduced to hourly and runs between Tattenham Corner and  only. Passengers for London Bridge have to change at Purley.

It was initially proposed that from 2018, when the Thameslink Programme is completed, services on this line would be operated with larger 12 car trains offering all day direct services to  via . However, in September 2016, these proposals were dropped; instead, services on the Tattenham Corner line are to "remain as Southern South London Metro services with increased capacity as compared to today".

References

External links 

Railway stations in the London Borough of Croydon
Former South Eastern Railway (UK) stations
Railway stations in Great Britain opened in 1904
Railway stations served by Govia Thameslink Railway